Kiefer-Stewart Co. v. Seagram & Sons, Inc., 340 U.S. 211 (1951), was a decision by the United States Supreme Court, which held that an agreement among competitors in interstate commerce to fix maximum resale prices of their products violates the Sherman Antitrust Act.

Background
The petitioner, Kiefer-Stewart Company, was an Indiana drug concern which does a wholesale liquor business. Respondents, Seagram and Calvert corporations, are affiliated companies that sell liquor in interstate commerce to Indiana wholesalers. The complaint charged that respondents had agreed or conspired to sell liquor only to those Indiana wholesalers who would resell at prices fixed by Seagram and Calvert, and that this agreement deprived Kiefer-Stewart of a continuing supply of liquor, to its great damage.

On the trial, evidence was introduced tending to show that Seagram had fixed maximum prices above which the wholesalers could not resell. The jury returned a verdict for petitioner, and damages were awarded. The United States Court of Appeals for the Seventh Circuit reversed. It held that an agreement among respondents to fix maximum resale prices did not violate the Sherman Act, because such prices promoted, rather than restrained, competition. It also held the evidence insufficient to show that respondents had acted in concert. Doubt as to the correctness of the decision on questions important in antitrust litigation prompted the Supreme Court to grant certiorari.

Holding
The Supreme Court ruled that the Court of Appeals erred in holding that an agreement among competitors to fix maximum resale prices of their products does not violate the Sherman Act. For such agreements, no less than those to fix minimum prices, cripple the freedom of traders, and thereby restrain their ability to sell in accordance with their own judgment. The Supreme Court reaffirmed United States v. Socony-Vacuum Oil Co. (1940):

See also
List of United States Supreme Court cases, volume 340
Albrecht v. Herald Co. (1968)

References

Further reading

External links

United States Supreme Court cases
United States Supreme Court cases of the Vinson Court
United States antitrust case law
1951 in United States case law
Seagram